The 3rd Lux Style Awards ceremony was held in Dubai, United Arab Emirates. The show was hosted by Humayun Saeed, Zara Sheikh and from the members of BNN. The show had the performances by Iman Ali and Reema Khan, Sana Nawaz, Veena Malik, Meera, Saba Qamar and Mikaal Zulfiqar etc. Some of the film and music categories were removed from the award. Most nominations in Television categories were received by serial Mehndi. It won all the categories in which it was nominated. Larki Punjaban led most nominations and awards in Film categories. PTV led most nominations and winning three.

Film

Television

Music

Special

References
 https://www.rewaj.pk/lux-style-awards-for-the-year-2004/

External links

Lux Style Awards
Lux Style Awards
Lux Style Awards
Lux Style Awards
Lux
Lux
Lux